Imre Wampetich (6 October 1883 – 3 October 1950) was a Hungarian rower. He competed in the men's eight event at the 1908 Summer Olympics.

References

External links
 Imre Wampetich

1883 births
1950 deaths
Burials at Kerepesi Cemetery
Hungarian male rowers
Olympic rowers of Hungary
Rowers at the 1908 Summer Olympics
Rowers from Budapest